Tramplin Stork (nickname:Aist) is a ski jumping arena in Nizhniy Tagil, Russia. It is a venue in the FIS Ski jumping World Cup.

Events

Men

Ladies

References

1970 establishments in Russia
Buildings and structures in Sverdlovsk Oblast
Ski jumping venues in Russia
Sport in Sverdlovsk Oblast
Sports venues completed in 1970